Jeremy Harrison (born January 29, 1978) is a Canadian provincial politician who is currently a Member of the Legislative Assembly of Saskatchewan, representing the riding of Meadow Lake.  Harrison is also the former Canadian Member of Parliament for the riding of Desnethé—Missinippi—Churchill River, a riding that encompasses the northern half of the province of Saskatchewan.

Born in Saskatoon, Harrison joined the Reform Party in 1996 and served in numerous positions in Reform, the Canadian Alliance, and the Conservative Party of Canada, including time as a political staffer in the Office of the Leader of the Opposition in Ottawa.  He worked for Stephen Harper's leadership campaign in 2002, and from 2002 to 2004 he served on the national executive of the Canadian Alliance. During this time Harrison was also enrolled at the University of Saskatchewan College of Law.  He graduated from that institution with a Bachelor of Law degree in the spring of 2004.  He later graduated with a Master's in Public Administration from the Johnson Shoyama Graduate School of Public Policy.

Federal politics
He was elected to Parliament as a Conservative in the 2004 federal election. Harrison was defeated in the 2006 federal election by Liberal opponent Gary Merasty.  On election night, the margin was 106 votes, which was reduced to 73 when election official reviewed the count sheets. He challenged the result, alleging threats and ballot stuffing by the Liberals, but a judicial recount confirmed Merasty's victory, by a reduced margin of 67 votes.  On February 20, Harrison announced that he would not pursue the matter further.

Harrison was cited as being part of the Conservative Party of Canada's alleged In-and-Out scheme during the 2006 election.

Provincial politics
Harrison was acclaimed as the Saskatchewan Party's candidate in Meadow Lake in June 2007.

He was initially declared defeated in the 2007 election, narrowly losing to incumbent MLA Maynard Sonntag in Meadow Lake, but was subsequently declared elected after a count error was noted the following day. The count of absentee ballots on November 19 confirmed Harrison's victory.

Following the election, Harrison was named legislative secretary to the minister of energy and resources, northern resources and oilsands development. On May 29, 2009, Premier Brad Wall appointed Harrison to the Executive Council of Saskatchewan as Minister of Municipal Affairs. On June 29, 2010, he was moved to Minister of Enterprise and Minister Responsible for Trade in a cabinet shuffle.

Harrison was re-elected in the 2011 election. Following the election, he was given an additional role as Government House Leader. Harrison was dropped from cabinet in May 2012, but retained his position as Government House Leader.

On June 5, 2014, Harrison returned to cabinet when appointed associate minister of the economy responsible for trade, tourism, innovation and immigration.

On August 20, 2017, Harrison announced his bid for the leadership of the Saskatchewan Party just days after party leader and Premier Brad Wall announced that he was retiring from politics. However, Harrison withdrew from the race on September 1 and announced he would support another candidate, Scott Moe, who on January 27, 2018, became the 15th Premier of Saskatchewan.

Electoral history

2016 Saskatchewan general election

2011 Saskatchewan general election

2007 Saskatchewan general election

2006 Canadian general election

2004 Canadian general election

Cabinet positions

References

External links
 
 

1978 births
Living people
Conservative Party of Canada MPs
Lawyers in Saskatchewan
Members of the Executive Council of Saskatchewan
Members of the House of Commons of Canada from Saskatchewan
People from Meadow Lake, Saskatchewan
Politicians from Saskatoon
Saskatchewan Party MLAs
University of Saskatchewan alumni
University of Saskatchewan College of Law alumni
21st-century Canadian politicians